Nuestro Tiempo is a progressive political party in El Salvador, founded in 2019. It is currently led by Andy Failer.

The party is mainly composed of a team of young adults who have not had political experience. Ideologically, the party positions itself as humanist centre, not being on the right or the left of the political spectrum, although various political analysts have placed it on the progressive left.

The party's legislative proposals include the legalization of same-sex marriage, the right of transgender people to change their gender identity, the decriminalization and legalization of abortion, and the withdrawal of El Salvador from the Central American Parliament.

Electoral history

Parliamentary elections

Municipal elections

References

2019 establishments in El Salvador
Political parties established in 2019
Political parties in El Salvador